Nargis (born Fatima Rashid; 1 June 1929 – 3 May 1981) was an Indian actress active between 1935 and 1968. She made her screen debut in a minor role at the age of five with Talash-E-Haq (1935), but her acting career actually began with the drama Tamanna (1942).

Her best-known role was that of Radha in the Academy Award-nominated Mother India (1957), a performance that won her the Filmfare Award for Best Actress. She would appear infrequently in films during the 1960s. Some of her films of this period include the drama Raat Aur Din (1967), for which she received the inaugural National Film Award for Best Actress.

Films

References

External links 

Actress filmographies
Indian filmographies